Brian Wenning is a former professional skateboarder formerly affiliated with Plan B Skateboards, Habitat Skateboards, and DC Shoes. He has appeared on ESPN.com and in several skating magazines.

References

Living people
American skateboarders
People from Monmouth Beach, New Jersey
Year of birth missing (living people)